İzel is a rare feminine Turkish given name. In Nahuatl, Izel means "only one", "unique".

People
 İzel Çeliköz, Turkish pop singer.
 İzel Hara, a Turkish radio comedian in Number 1 FM (see Turkish Wikipedia article).
 Izel Jenkins, American footballer
 İzel Rozental, a Turkish caricaturist of Jewish origin, a businessman, and a columnist writing for Şalom (see Turkish Wikipedia article).

Fictional characters 
 Izel (Agents of S.H.I.E.L.D.)
 Izel (Onyx Equinox)

See also
 Izlel ye Delyo Haydutin
 Izel-lès-Hameau

Turkish feminine given names